Pearl Mystic is the first studio album and second long play record by British rock band Hookworms, released on 4 March 2013 on Gringo Records (UK), and later Weird World (Rest of World), an imprint of Domino. The album's namesake is pearl mystic turquoise, also the colour of the sleeve artwork.

Critical reception
The album received positive reviews on release, and was later named in end of year critics lists. It was named Loud and Quiet, BrooklynVegan, and Drowned in Sound's number one album of 2013.  The Skinny, Jim Fusilli of The Wall Street Journal, and several major UK record stores (Norman Records, Music Exchange, Rise, Piccadilly Records, Sister Ray Records, Resident Records, and Drift Records) placed Pearl Mystic in their top ten releases of 2013, with the record also appearing in Time Out, NME, and The Guardian's top-rated records of that year.

Track listing

Personnel

Hookworms
 EG – Drums, percussion
 JW – Guitars, sleeves and design
 MB – Bass, synths
 MJ – Vocals, backing vocals, keyboards, synths, producing, recording, mixing
 SS – Guitars

Additional
 Published by Domino Publishing Co. Ltd
 Recorded by MJ at Suburban Home Studios, Leeds
 Mixed by MJ at Suburban Home Studios, Leeds
 Mastered by Carl Saff at Saff Mastering
 Sleeves, design by JW (Idiot's Pasture)

References

2013 albums
Hookworms (band) albums
Domino Recording Company albums